Operation Asbury Park was a deployment, on June 2, 2004, and June 17, 2004, of taskforce 1/6 BLT of the 22nd Marine Expeditionary Unit engaged Taliban and other anti-coalition forces in both Oruzgan Province and Zabul Province culminating in the Dai Chopan region of Afghanistan. This operation was characterized by atypical fighting on the side of the tactics of the Taliban and the other guerillas encountered.

During Asbury Park, the 22nd Marine Expeditionary Unit was faced with an opponent that frequently would dig in and engage the Marine forces, rather than the traditional hit and run (or "asymmetric attack") methods. As such, Marines, with the aid of B-1B Lancer, A-10 Warthog, and AH-64 Apache aircraft, engaged in "pitched battles each day," culminating in a large battle on June 8.

The last of the fighting which took place near Dai Chopan on June 8 was decisive in that enemy forces were depleted to such an extent that no further contact was made with the enemy for the duration of the operation. What was meant by the enemy to be a three pronged attack June 8, 2004 resulted in over eighty-five confirmed kills, with estimates well in excess of 100 enemy dead, an estimated 200-300 wounded, with dozens captured. While throughout the entire operation a "handful" of US forces and Afghan Militia were injured.

Asbury Park was followed by Operation Asbury Park II, which included Army personnel from the 25th Infantry Division, Afghan National Army troops, and attached Marines.

References

External links 
 22nd Marine Expeditionary Unit (SOC) homepage

Asbury Park
Asbury Park
United States Marine Corps in the War in Afghanistan (2001–2021)
History of Urozgan Province
History of Zabul Province
June 2004 events in Asia